Novodomikan is a rural locality (a selo) in Chernigovsky Selsoviet of Arkharinsky District, Amur Oblast, Russia. The population was 62 as of 2018. There are 3 streets.

Geography 
Novodomikan is located on the left bank of the Domikan River, 45 km north of Arkhara (the district's administrative centre) by road. Domikan is the nearest rural locality.

References 

Rural localities in Arkharinsky District